The 2005 TAC Cup season was the 14th season of the TAC Cup competition. Gippsland Power have won their 1st premiership title after defeating the Dandenong Stingrays in the grand final by 15 points.

This is the latest season up to date where a team has not won any match during the season. Bendigo has made an imperfect season.

Ladder

Grand final

References 

NAB League
Nab League